Sale San Giovanni is a comune (municipality) in the Province of Cuneo in the Italian region Piedmont, located about  southeast of Turin and about  east of Cuneo.

Sale San Giovanni borders the following municipalities: Camerana, Ceva, Mombarcaro, Paroldo, and Sale delle Langhe.

Demographic evolution

References

Cities and towns in Piedmont
Comunità Montana Valli Mongia, Cevetta e Langa Cebana